The 2017 ASUN women's basketball tournament was the 31st edition of the ASUN Conference championship. It took place March 3, 8 and 12, 2017 in several arenas. Florida Gulf Coast won the tournament and received an automatic trip to the NCAA women's tournament.

Format
The ASUN Championship is a six-day single-elimination tournament. Eight teams competed in the championship, with the higher seeded team in each matchup hosting the game.

Seeds

Schedule

Bracket

See also
 2017 ASUN men's basketball tournament

References

External links 
Championship Details

Tournament
ASUN women's basketball tournament